Voice of Maldives, or Dhivehi Raajjeyge Adu, is a radio station in the Republic of Maldives. Raajjé Radio, owned by the state, began broadcasting in 1962, under the name 'Male Radio'. It runs two radio channels, Voice of Maldives  on 1458 kHz AM with a live internet stream  (news and information) and RajjeFM (entertainment).

Voice of Maldives is a national radio service and is operated by the Ministry of Information Arts and Culture under the Government of the Republic of Maldives. Sound broadcasting started in India in 1962 with the proliferation of private radio clubs. The operations of Voice of Maldives began formally on 11 September 1966 as a government organization, with clear objectives to inform, educate and entertain the public.

The VOM today has a one main broadcasting centre and two re-broadcasting centers. The coverage is about 90% of the whole Maldives via MW (Medium Wave transmission) at 1449 kHz; the remaining 10% is covered using small FM transmitters via a radio uplink/downlink from satellites. Voice of Maldives also has one FM broadcasting service, most of the FM transmissions are concentrated on entertainment and music. The transmitting frequency is 89 MHz. The coverage area is about 30 kilometers from the capital Male. There are facilities to broadcast 24 hours per day. and most of the programmes are broadcast in the Maldivian language as they have been for over forty-two years.

History

Broadcasting in the Republic of Maldives began under the name of Malé Radio on 29 December 1962 as a normal radio communication set without any specialized knowledge of broadcasting. During this time, the broadcasting equipments were locally made by hobbyists. The programmes were only aired for about five to ten minutes with two minutes of news and current affairs. Within a short period of only one year, the radio service was taken over by CINEMA Company and the broadcasting service was renamed to SENECO RADIO with newly built local SW transmitters. The broadcasting became a fully government operated service on 11 September 1966, and again on 19 February 1967, its name was changed to Maldives Island Broadcasting service (MIBS).

As the broadcasting gained more popularity, the government decided to run the broadcasting in a purposely built building on 26 June 1968. With the advent of new technologies and due to the importance of this indispensable service, the government decided to re-structure the service and later renamed to Radio Maldives on 16 February 1969. From 1970 onwards, as the Maldives is a 100 percent Muslim country; Radio Maldives thought the radio could play a major role in religious teachings. As a result, Radio Maldives started a daily broadcasting of the Dhivehi translation of Quran every morning. This is one of the few programmes that are still broadcast daily.

Among the most popular programmes during those days is called Radio Haveeru, a programme specially dedicated to self-improvement and public awareness. Late seventies played an important role in the history of Voice of Maldives Maldives, it became even more popular among the public, and thus it has to increase its current air time to allow 09 hrs and 15 minutes daily for local programmes which concentrated on music. 21/2 hours daily dedicated to International News and music.

Radio Maldives was renamed Voice of Maldives by President Maumoon Abdul Gayyoom on 19 January 1980. On 29 December 1981, the government secured a grant aid from the Australian Government which provided a 5-kilowatt medium-wave transmitter. With the ever-increasing demand for radio, there was an immediate need for a building expansion to cater for recording and production studios which gave way to a foundation for a totally new building. This is the present Voice of Maldives building at Maafannu. , the Voice of Maldives used a 10KW digital medium wave transmitter from Harris operating at 1449 kHz for its AM transmission.

References

Mass media in the Maldives
Radio in the Maldives